Nordvik may refer to:

People
Andreas Nordvik (born 1987), a Norwegian footballer
Hans Nordvik (1880–1960), a Norwegian sport rifle shooter
Jørgen Nordvik (1895–1977), a Norwegian jurist

Places

Norway
Nordvik, a former municipality in Nordland county
Nordvik, Vestland, a village in the municipalities of Bergen and Bjørnafjorden in Vestland county

Russia
Nordvik (port), a former harbor in the Khatanga Gulf
Nordvik, Russia, a former town in Krasnoyarsk Krai (abandoned in 1956)
Nordvik Bay, a gulf in the Laptev Sea

See also
 Norvik